This is a list of newspapers in the U.S. state of  Nebraska. The list is divided between papers currently being produced and those produced in the past and subsequently terminated.

Daily newspapers
 Beatrice Daily Sun – Beatrice
 Columbus Telegram – Columbus
 Fremont Tribune – Fremont
 Grand Island Independent – Grand Island
 Hastings Tribune – Hastings
 Holdrege Daily Citizen – Holdrege
 Kearney Hub – Kearney
 Lincoln Journal Star – Lincoln
 McCook Daily Gazette – McCook
 Norfolk Daily News – Norfolk
 North Platte Telegraph – North Platte
 Omaha World-Herald – Omaha
 Star-Herald – Scottsbluff
 York News-Times – York
Weekly and semi-weekly newspapers
 Ainsworth Star-Journal – Ainsworth
 Albion News – Albion
 Alliance Times-Herald – Alliance
Antelope County News/Orchard News – Neligh
 Harlan County Journal – Alma
 Ashland Gazette – Ashland
 Nemaha County Herald – Auburn
 Aurora News-Register – Aurora
 Bellevue Leader – Bellevue
 Pilot-Tribune & Enterprise – Blair
 Custer County Chief – Broken Bow
 Burwell Tribune – Burwell
 The Republican-Nonpareil – Central City
 The Chadron Record – Chadron
 Colfax County Press – Clarkson
 Crawford Clipper/Harrison Sun – Crawford
 The Crete News – Crete
The Banner-Press – David City
 Doniphan Herald – Doniphan
 The Elgin Review – Elgin
 Douglas County Post-Gazette – Elkhorn
 Fairbury Journal News – Fairbury
 Falls City Journal – Falls City
 Nance County Journal – Fullerton
 The Nebraska Signal – Geneva
 Gering Courier – Gering
 Sheridan County Journal-Star – Gordon
 Gothenburg Leader – Gothenburg 
 Grant Tribune-Sentinel – Grant
 Cedar County News – Hartington
 Hebron Journal Register – Hebron
 The Voice News – Hickman
 Humphrey Democrat – Humphrey
 Imperial Republican – Imperial
 The Western Nebraska Observer – Kimball
 Laurel Advocate – Laurel
 Lexington Clipper-Herald – Lexington
 Nebraska Farmer – Lincoln
 Sherman County Times – Loup City
 Milford Times – Milford
 Minden Courier – Minden
 Hooker County Tribune – Mullen
 Nebraska City News-Press – Nebraska City
 Neligh News & Leader – Neligh
 Nuckolls County Locomotive-Gazette – Nelson
 North Bend Eagle – North Bend
 Oakland Independent – Oakland
 Osmond Republican – Osmond
 Omaha Star – North Omaha
 Holt County Independent – O'Neill
 The Ord Quiz – Ord
 Garden County News – Oshkosh
 The Pawnee Republican – Pawnee City
 Papillion Times – Papillion
 The Pender Times – Pender
 Petersburg Press – Petersburg
 Pierce County Leader – Pierce
 Plainview News – Plainview
 The Plattsmouth Journal – Plattsmouth
 The Randolph Times – Randolph
 Ralston Recorder – Ralston
 Ravenna News – Ravenna
 Red Cloud Chief – Red Cloud
 Schuyler Sun – Schuyler
 Seward County Independent – Seward
 The Shelton Clipper – Shelton - Gibbon - Wood River - Cairo, Nebraska
 Sidney Sun-Telegraph – Sidney
 Dakota County Star – South Sioux City
 Polk County News – Stromsburg
 Superior Express – Superior
 Clay County News – Sutton
 Syracuse Journal-Democrat – Syracuse
 Tecumseh Chieftain – Tecumseh
 Hitchcock County News – Trenton
 Valentine Midland News – Valentine
 The Verdigre Eagle – Verdigre
 Wahoo Newspaper -- Wahoo
 Wauneta Breeze – Wauneta
 Wausa Gazette – Wausa
 The Waverly News – Waverly
 The Wayne Herald – Wayne
 West Point News – West Point
 Wisner News-Chronicle – Wisner
 Wymore Arbor State – Wymore

College newspapers
 Daily Nebraskan – University of Nebraska–Lincoln
 The Antelope – University of Nebraska at Kearney
 The Gateway – University of Nebraska Omaha
 The Creightonian – Creighton University
 The Wayne Stater – Wayne State College
 The ViewPoint - Northeast Community College
 The Eagle – Chadron State College
 The Doane Owl – Doane University

Newspapers no longer in print
 Afro-American Sentinel – Omaha (1892–1925)
 The Alliance Herald – Alliance (1895–1922)
 The American Record – Plattsmouth (1945–1948)
 Bellevue Gazette – Bellevue (1856–1858)
 The Capital City Courier – Lincoln (1887–1893)
 Cherry County independent – Valentine (1892–1896)
 The Columbus Journal – Columbus (1878–1911)
 The Commoner – Lincoln (1901–1922)
 The Conservative – Lincoln (1898–1902)
 The Courier – Lincoln (1899–1910)
 Custer County Republican – Broken Bow (1887–1893)
 Dakota City herald – Dakota City (1859–1860)
 Dakota County Herald – Dakota City (1899–1922)
 The Enterprise – Omaha (1893–1920)
 The Falls City Tribune – Falls City (1904–1908)
 The Gothenburg Times – Gothenburg (1908–2022)
 Heartland Messenger – Omaha (2006–2008)
 Hesperian Student – Lincoln (1844–1890)
 Lincoln County Tribune – North Platte (1885–1890)
 The McCook Tribune – McCook (1885–1912)
 McCook weekly tribune – McCook (1883–1885)
 The Monitor – Omaha (1915–1929)
 Nebraska Advertiser – Brownville (1856–1899)
 The Nebraska Advertiser – Nemaha City (1899–1908)
 Nebraska palladium – Bellevue City (1854–1855)
 The New Era – Omaha (1921–1926)
 The Norfolk Weekly News-Journal – Norfolk (1900–1912)
 The Norfolk weekly news – Norfolk (1899–1900)
 The North Platte Semi-Weekly Tribune – North Platte (1895–1922)
 The North Platte Tribune – North Platte (1890–1894)
 Omaha Chronicle – Omaha (1933–1938)
 Omaha Daily Bee – Omaha (1872–1927; Omaha Bee-News, 1927–1937)
 Omaha Guide – Omaha (1927–1958)
 Omaha Sun – Omaha (1951–1983)
 The Omaha Whip – Omaha (1922)
 Ozvěna západu – Clarkson (1914–1917)
 The Plattsmouth Daily Herald – Plattsmouth (1883–1892)
 The Plattsmouth Herald – Plattsmouth (1892–1910)
 The Plattsmouth Journal – Plattsmouth (1821–1939)
 The Plattsmouth Weekly Herald – Plattsmouth (1865–1900)
 The Plattsmouth Weekly Journal – Plattsmouth (1890–1901)
 Přítel lidu – Wahoo (1895–1904)
 The Progress – Omaha (1889–1906)
 The Red Cloud Chief – Red Cloud (1873–1923)
 Saturday morning courier – Lincoln (1893–1894)
 Semi-Weekly News-Herald – Plattsmouth (1894–1898)
 Sunday Morning Courier – Lincoln (1893–1893)
 Tri-City Trib – Cozad (1965-2022)
 Valentine Democrat – Valentine (1900–1912)
 The Valentine Democrat – Valentine (1896–1898)
 Western News-Democrat – Valentine (1898–1900)
 Wilberské listy – Wilber (1905–1914)
 The Huntsman's Echo – Wood River (1860–1861)

See also

External links
 List of Nebraska newspapers at the Nebraska Press Association

References

Nebraska